Dean Sutherland (born March 24, 1954) is an American politician who served in the Washington House of Representatives from the 17th district from 1983 to 1989 and in the Washington State Senate from the 17th district from 1989 to 1996.

References

1954 births
Living people
Democratic Party members of the Washington House of Representatives
Democratic Party Washington (state) state senators